The Ministry of the Interior of Peru is charged with administrating the interior government of Peru as well managing National Police of Peru. , the minister is Vicente Romero.

Functions
To plan, formulate, direct, control, and evaluate the policy of the sector
To direct, conduct, coordinate, and supervise the actions of the interior government and immigration and naturalization as well as to control security services, weapons, munitions, and civil-use explosives
To maintain and establish internal order and public order
To prevent and combat delinquency, and to investigate crimes
To ensure the vigilance and integrity of the nation's borders as well as to protect and maintain custody over public and private heritage
To realize intelligence activities within the scope that the law entails
Other functions that the law entails

Vision
To be a competent sector and to maintain levels of high productivity, to guarantee the populace freedom to exercise their fundamental rights and liberties, to protect democratic internal order, public order and the safety of the citizen, promoting the values of democracy, of culture, peace, and human rights.

External links
Official Website of the Ministry of the Interior

Interior
Peru
Revolutionary Government of the Armed Forces of Peru